Gurdaspur is a city in the Indian state of Punjab, between the rivers Beas and Ravi. It houses the administrative headquarters of Gurdaspur District and is in the geographical centre of the district, which shares a border with Pakistan.

Gurdaspur city was named after Mahant Guriya das ji. The Emperor Akbar was crowned at Kalanaur, which is 26 km from the city.

Demographics
According to the 2011 India census, Gurdaspur had a population of 2,299,026 (1,212,995 males and 1,086,031 females). There was a 9.30% increase in population compared to that of 2001. In the previous 2001 census of India, Gurdaspur District had recorded a 19.74% increase to its population compared to 1991. According to religion, Hindus made up 68.9% of the city's population, with Sikhs making up 24.8%. 

The average literacy rate of Gurdaspur in 2011 was 81.10%, compared to 73.80% in 2001. The male and female literacy rates were 85.90% and 75.70%, respectively. For the 2001 census, the rates were 79.80% and 67.10% respectively. The total literate population was 1,668,339, consisting of 928,264 males and 740,075 females. Sex ratio is about 895 females per 1000 males. Population Density was 649 per square km.

Politics
The city is part of the Gurudaspur Assembly Constituency and Gurdaspur (Lok Sabha constituency).

Education
Gurdaspur has many elementary and secondary level schools and has 13 degree level and engineering colleges. Beant College of Engineering and Technology, is among them, founded by then Chief Minister Beant Singh in 1995. A nationally accredited body by Ministry of Tourism (India) Institute of Hotel Management, Catering & Nutrition is also located in Gurdaspur.

Colleges
Beant College of Engineering and Technology

Administrative towns

 Batala
 Qadian
 Kalanaur
 Sri Hargobindpur
 Dera Baba Nanak
 Dhariwal
 Dinanagar
 Fatehgarh Churian

Notable people
 Dev Anand (Film Actor)
 Mahbub ul Haq (Economist)
 Premchand Degra (Body builder)
 Vinod Khanna (Ex-MP)
 Vijay Anand (Filmmaker)
 Chetan Anand (Filmmaker)
 Guru Randhawa (Singer) 
 Aditya Puri (Businessman)
 Gurpreet Ghuggi (Film actor)
 Shivil Kaushik (Cricketer)
 Ranjit Bawa (Singer)
 AP Dhillon (Singer)
 Romesh Sharma (Film actor)
 Preet Harpal (Singer)
 Jasbir Jassi (Singer)
 Nimrat Khaira (Singer)
 Avtar Singh (Olympic judo player)
 Gurmeet Bawa (Singer)
 Sunny Deol (MP)
 Surjit Singh (Field hockey player)
 Sunanda Sharma (Singer)

See also
 Bathwala
 Ranjit Bagh

References

Further reading
 Chester, Lucy P. Borders and Conflict in South Asia: The Radcliffe Boundary Commission and the Partition of Punjab. Manchester UP, 2009.
 
 

 
Cities and towns in Gurdaspur district
Gurdaspur